The Anuy is a left tributary of the Ob originating in the Altai mountains of Siberia, Russia.

The Chyorny Anuy and the smaller Bely Anuy join to form the Anuy. The two rivers join near Soloneshensky District.

The Anuy is frozen between November and April. It is not navigable.

References

This article is based on a partial translation of the corresponding German web site from March 29, 2010.

Rivers of Altai Krai
Rivers of the Altai Republic